Route 80, also known as Trinity Road, is a  north–south highway along the Avalon Peninsula of Newfoundland. It connects the communities along the eastern side of Trinity Bay with the Trans Canada Highway (TCH).

Route description
Route 80 begins at an interchange between Route 1 (TCH) and Route 81 (Markland Road, exit 28 on Route 1) at the northern edge of Whitbourne. It heads north to pass through Blaketown and along the shores of Dildo Pond before following the coastline to pass through South Dildo, where it has an intersection with a local road leading to Old Shop, and Dildo. The highway turns more inland as it passes through New Harbour to an intersection with Route 73 (New Harbour Road) before passing through Hopeall and Green's Harbour. Route 80 passes along the coast again as heads north through Whiteway, Cavendish, Heart's Delight-Islington, Heart's Desire, and Heart's Content, where it intersects Route 74 (Heart’s Content Highway). The highway now winds its way through New Perilcan, Turks Cove, Winterton, Hant's Harbour, and New Chelsea-New Melbourne-Brownsdale-Sibley's Cove-Lead Cove before arriving in Old Perlican at an intersection with Route 70 (Conception Bay Highway). Route 80 turns north through town along Blow Me Down Road for a short distance before ending at an intersection with Marine Drive and Main Street. Marine Drive continues north to the Harbour while Main Street continues on to Daniel's Cove and Grates Cove.

As with most highways on the island, the entire length of Route 80 is a two-lane highway.

Major intersections

See also
 
List of highways numbered 80

References

080